The 2023 Season will be the Athletes Unlimited Basketball's second in existence. The season will be played in Dallas, Texas and will run from February 22 to March 25. The format in which teams are redrafted each week allows athletes to accumulate points for both individual and team performances, culminating with one individual winner.

Players

Scoring system
There are multiple ways for players to accumulate points during games to make their way into 1 of the 4 captain spots.

Win Points
Win points are all about the team performance. They accumulate during both individual quarters and overall game wins. Each quarter is worth +50 points and overall games are worth +150 points.
If a quarter is tied, the points roll over to the subsequent quarter.

Game MVPs
After each game, the players and members of The Unlimited Club will vote for players who they feel had standout performances.
These points will be added to the player's individual total. Points will be awarded as follows:
MVP 1: +90 points
MVP 2: +60 points
MVP 3: +30 points

Individual Stats
The final component of points is individual stats. Players will earn points based on their performance:
Assist: +10
Steal: +10
Block: +10
Shooting Foul Drawn: +4
Personal Foul Drawn: +4
Offensive Foul Drawn: +8
Defensive Rebound: +5
Offensive Rebound: +10
Made FT: +10
Made 2: +20
Made 3: +30

Players can also lose points for certain actions, such as committing fouls, turning over the ball or missing a shot:
Shooting Foul Committed: -8
Personal Foul Committed: -8
Offensive Foul Committed: -16
Other Foul Committed: -8
Turnover: -10
Missed FT: -10
Missed 2: -10
Missed 3: -10

Captains
Each week, based on the point system, the top 4 players will draft their teams. They will draft in a snake style system. Week 1 Captains were chosen based on the final leaderboard standings from the first season. Lexie Brown and Isabelle Harrison would have been captains, but they were replaced by Sims and Williams due to pre-approved absences. 

Week 1 Captains: Taj Cole, Odyssey Sims, Natasha Cloud, and Courtney Williams
Week 2 Captains: Odyssey Sims, Isabelle Harrison, NaLyssa Smith, and Naz Hillmon

Games

Week 1

|-
| rowspan=2 | Thursday, February 23
| 6:00 p.m.
| style="background: blue; color: white;"|Team Williams
| vs
| style="background: orange; color: white;"|Team Sims
| WNBA League PassWomen's Sport Network
| 96-93 OT
| Odyssey Sims (30)
| NaLyssa Smith (10)
| Odyssey Sims (12)
| Lexie Hull (2)
|-
| 8:30 p.m.
| style="background: yellow; color: white;"|Team Cloud
| vs
| style="background: purple; color: white;"|Team Cole
| WNBA League PassWomen's Sport Network
| 78-72
| CanadaGrayBradford (21)
| Crystal Bradford (14)
| Natasha Cloud (5)
| BradfordStatiCarsonWalker (1)
|-
| rowspan=2 | Friday, February 24
| 6:00 p.m.
| style="background: purple; color: white;"|Team Cole
| vs
| style="background: orange; color: white;"|Team Sims
| WNBA League PassBally Sports Network
| 95-120
| Kelsey Mitchell (28)
| NaLyssa Smith (16)
| Odyssey Sims (14)
| Lexie Hull (3)
|-
| 8:30 p.m.
| style="background: blue; color: white;"|Team Williams
| vs
| style="background: yellow; color: white;"|Team Cloud
| WNBA League PassBally Sports Network
| 75-67
| Natasha Cloud (18)
| Naz Hillmon (12)
| Courtney Williams (8)
| WestbrookCarson (2)
|-
| rowspan=2 | Sunday, February 26
| 2:30 p.m.
| style="background: purple; color: white;"|Team Cole
| vs
| style="background: blue; color: white;"|Team Williams
| CBS Sports Network
| 75-89
| Isabelle Harrison (27)
| Crystal Bradford (13)
| Courtney Williams (8)
| Allisha Gray (3)
|-
| 4:30 p.m.
| style="background: orange; color: white;"|Team Sims
| vs
| style="background: yellow; color: white;"|Team Cloud
| CBS Sports Network
| 91-66
| NaLyssa Smith (24)
| NaLyssa Smith (12)
| Odyssey Sims (12)
| G'mrice Davis (2)

Week 2

|-
| rowspan=2 | Wednesday, March 1
| 6:00 p.m.
| style="background: blue; color: white;"|Team Smith
| vs
| style="background: orange; color: white;"|Team Harrison
| WNBA League PassWomen's Sports Network
|
|
|
|
|
|-
| 8:30 p.m.
| style="background: yellow; color: white;"|Team Sims
| vs
| style="background: purple; color: white;"|Team Hillmon
| WNBA League PassWomen's Sports Network
|
|
|
|
|
|-
| rowspan=2 | Friday, March 3
| 6:00 p.m.
| style="background: purple; color: white;"|Team Hillmon
| vs
| style="background: orange; color: white;"|Team Harrison
| WNBA League Pass
|
|
|
|
|
|-
| 8:30 p.m.
| style="background: blue; color: white;"|Team Smith
| vs
| style="background: yellow; color: white;"|Team Sims
| WNBA League PassWomen's Sports Network
|
|
|
|
|
|-
| rowspan=2 | Saturday, March 4
| 6:00 p.m.
| style="background: purple; color: white;"|Team Hillmon
| vs
| style="background: blue; color: white;"|Team Smith
| WNBA League PassBally Sports
|
|
|
|
|
|-
| 8:30 p.m.
| style="background: orange; color: white;"|Team Harrison
| vs
| style="background: yellow; color: white;"|Team Sims
| WNBA League PassBally Sports
|
|
|
|
|

Team Captain Records

References

Sports in Dallas
2022–23 in American basketball